Smyser may refer to:

People
Martin L. Smyser (1851–1908), U.S. Representative from Ohio
Melinda Smyser (born 1958), Idaho State Senator

Other
Smyser and English Pharmacy, historic pharmacy building in Germantown, Philadelphia